Psaila is a Maltese surname. Notable people with the surname include:
Giuseppe Psaila (1891–1960), Art Nouveau architect
Jes Psaila (born 1964), guitarist
Dun Karm Psaila (1871–1961), priest, writer and poet regarded as the "National Poet of Malta"
Pippo Psaila (born 1957), football coach

Maltese-language surnames